"A Fool Like You" is a 1973 song by Tim Moore from his eponymous debut album. Donald Fagen is featured on backing vocals. The song reached number 93 on the Billboard Hot 100 during the spring of that year.  It was his first of four charting singles in the United States.

Chart history

Cover versions
 "A Fool Like You" was covered by Eric Andersen in 1973 and released as a non-album promotional single.
 Billy J. Kramer covered the song in 1973, which received a European release during the fall of the year.
 The song was covered by Iain Matthews for his 1976 album Go For Broke from which it was issued as the second single.
 Bo Donaldson and The Heywoods recorded the song on their 1976 LP Farther On.

References

External links
Lyrics of this song
 
 

1973 songs
1973 singles
Tim Moore (singer-songwriter) songs
Bo Donaldson and The Heywoods songs
Iain Matthews songs
ABC Records singles
Polydor Records singles